Carnllundain or Carn Llundain is the highest elevation of Ramsey Island in Pembrokeshire, Wales.

Geography 
The top of the hill is marked by a large cairn and a trig point. On clear days it offers a view of a long stretch of Pembrokeshire coastline, Skomer Island and, across the Irish Sea, of SW Ireland.

History
The area surrounding the hill is of archaeological interest and hosts some Bronze Age stone wall remains. Carn Llundain—along with Carn Ysgubor, located near the northern shore of Ramsey Island—during middle ages offered a useful landmark to seafaring pilgrims heading to St Davids.

Access to the summit 

The summit of the hill can be reached with a short waymarked diversion from the trail round the island; no special hiking ability is required, but wearing proper outdoor clothing is advisable.

Conservation 
Carnllundain and Ramsey Island are owned and managed by the Royal Society for the Protection of Birds (RSPB).

See also 

 Lists of mountains and hills in the British Isles

References

Mountains and hills of Pembrokeshire